HMS Venus was an  protected cruiser built for the Royal Navy in the mid-1890s.

Design
Eclipse-class second-class protected cruisers were preceded by the shorter s. Venus had a displacement of  when at normal load. She was powered by two inverted triple-expansion steam engines which used steam from eight cylindrical boilers.

She carried five 40-calibre  quick-firing (QF) guns in single mounts protected by gun shields. One gun was mounted on the forecastle, two on the quarterdeck and one pair was abreast the bridge. The secondary armament consisted of six 40-calibre  guns; three on each broadside. She was fitted with three 18-inch torpedo tubes, one submerged tube on each broadside and one above water in the stern. Its ammunition supply consisted of 200 six-inch rounds per gun, 250 shells for each 4.7-inch gun, 300 rounds per gun for the 12-pounders and 500 for each three-pounder. Venus had ten torpedoes, presumably four for each broadside tube and two for the stern tube.

Service history

Venus was launched at Fairfield's Govan shipyard on 5 September 1895.Venus was commissioned by Sir Archibald Berkeley Milne in November 1897, and served at the Mediterranean Station. Captain Henry Morton Tudor was appointed in command on 14 February 1900, while she was still in the Mediterranean, and served until March 1901, when she paid off at Chatham Dockyard. In March 1900 she visited Corfu.

She was recommissioned in early 1903 by Captain Charles Home Cochran and the crew of HMS Australia, whose duties as coastguard ship at Southampton she took over. During this period she was also used as a training ship for naval cadets.

In 1908 Venus attended the Quebec Tercentenary in Canada.

She joined the 3rd Fleet at Pembroke in 1913 and went to Portsmouth in 1914. Joined the 11th Cruiser Squadron in Ireland in August 1914; captured two German merchantmen in October and lost her foremast in a gale in November 1914. To Egypt 1916; Singapore March 1917; flagship East Indies 1919 until she returned home in May 1919 to pay off.

References

Bibliography

External links

 

Eclipse-class cruisers
Ships built in Govan
1895 ships